The Montana State Bobcats men's basketball team represents Montana State University in the Big Sky Conference in NCAA Division I. The Bobcats are currently led by alumnus Danny Sprinkle and play their home games on campus at Brick Breeden Fieldhouse in Bozeman, Montana. MSU has appeared in the NCAA tournament five times, most recently with consecutive bids in 2022 and 2023.

Montana State began varsity intercollegiate competition in basketball in 1902. The Bobcats were retroactively recognized as the pre-NCAA tournament national champion for the 1928–29 season by the Premo-Porretta Power Poll and the Helms Athletic Foundation. Cat Thompson played for the Bobcats from 1926–30; a four-year All-American, he was the Helms Player of the Year in 1929, and was inducted into the Naismith Memorial Basketball Hall of Fame in 1962.

Postseason

NCAA tournament results
The Bobcats have appeared in five NCAA Tournaments, with a combined record of 0–5.

NIT results
The Bobcats have appeared in two National Invitation Tournaments, with a combined record of 1–2.

NAIA tournament results
The Bobcats appeared in seven NAIA Tournaments, with a combined record of 1–7.

Season results

References

External links